Brad Drewett and Broderick Dyke were the defending champions but did not compete that year.

Eric Jelen and Michael Mortensen won in the final 6–2, 3–6, 6–3 against Jakob Hlasek and John McEnroe.

Seeds

  Jakob Hlasek /  John McEnroe (final)
  Eric Jelen /  Michael Mortensen (champions)
  Patrick Baur /  Rikard Bergh (first round)
  Niclas Kroon /  Peter Lundgren (first round)

Draw

External links
 1989 Grand Prix de Tennis de Lyon Doubles Draw

1989 Grand Prix (tennis)